Bartonella silvicola is a bacterium from the genus of Bartonella.

References

Bartonellaceae
Undescribed species